Billie Holiday ( MG C-161) is the third 10 inch LP album of original material by jazz singer Billie Holiday, released on Clef Records in 1954 (her final album would also be given the same title, prior to being changed to Last Recording instead). The recordings took place in 1952 and 1954. Holiday never entered the recording studio in 1953.

Content
In a 1954 review, Down Beat magazine praises the album, saying:
"The set is an experience in mounting pleasure that can do anything but increase still further no matter how often the LP is replayed. As for comparing it with earlier Teddy Wilson-Billie sessions, what's the point? Count your blessings in having both. Speaking of time, Billie's beat and variations thereon never cease to be among the seven wonders of jazz."

Two recordings, "What a Little Moonlight Can Do" and "I Cried for You" were also recorded by Holiday in the 1930s with Teddy Wilson's band, at the beginning of her career.

In 1956, when the 10inch format was phased out, Clef reissued the contents of this album on two different newly released 12inch compilation LPs. Five songs (tracks A1-B1) were added to A Recital By Billie Holiday (MG C-686), and the other three (tracks B2-4) were added to Solitude (MG C-690 ).

Track listing
A side
 "Love for Sale" (Cole Porter) – 2:56
 "Moonglow" (Eddie DeLange, Will Hudson, Irving Mills) – 2:58
 "Everything I Have Is Yours" (Harold Adamson, Burton Lane) – 3:43
 "If the Moon Turns Green" (George Cates, Bernie Hanighen) – 2:46

B side
 "Autumn in New York" (Vernon Duke) – 3:43
 "How Deep Is the Ocean?" (Irving Berlin) – 3:00
 "What a Little Moonlight Can Do" (Harry M. Woods) – 3:14
 "I Cried for You" (Gus Arnheim, Arthur Freed, Abe Lyman) – 2:27

Personnel

April, 1952 Recordings
(Tracks A1–B1)
The exact date of this session is not known. Norman Granz signed Holiday to his record label after returning from Europe April 21, 1952, so the session presumably occurred sometime after that.
Billie Holiday, vocals
Flip Phillips, tenor sax
Charlie Shavers, trumpet
Oscar Peterson, piano
Barney Kessel, guitar
Alvin Stoller, drums
Ray Brown, bass

April 14, 1954 Recordings
(Tracks B2-4)
Billie Holiday, vocals
Charlie Shavers, trumpet
Oscar Peterson, piano
Herb Ellis, guitar
Ed Shaughnessy, drums
Ray Brown, bass

References

Billie Holiday albums
1954 albums
Clef Records albums
Verve Records albums
Albums produced by Norman Granz